Kate Middleton (born 23 December 1987) is the current New Zealand record holder in the free immersion discipline (FIM) and constant weight with fins (CWT). She is the third-deepest woman in the world and Vice World Champion Freediver. She owns a yoga and freediving resort in Gili Trawangan, Indonesia, where she trains and teaches.

New Zealand records
 97 metres in CWT  at Vertical Blue 2017, Bahamas (bronze medal)
 84 metres in FIM at Vertical Blue 2017, Bahamas  (gold medal)
 85 metres in CWT  at Vertical Blue 2016, Bahamas 
 72 metres CWT and 76 meters FIM at, Cyprus, Limasol, Depth World Championship 11–20 September 2015 (silver medal)
 68 metres CWT and 73 meters FIM at  Vertical Blue 2014, Bahamas, Bali, December 2014
 66 metres CWT at the One Breath Jamboree, Tulamben, Bali, October 2013
 65 metres FIM at the One Breath Jamboree, Tulamben, Bali, October 2013
 61 metres in FIM at the AIDA Individual World Championships, Kalamata, Greece, September 2013

An in-depth movie was made in 2012 about her life in Indonesia.

References

External links
 Kate Middleton Freediver Profile
 Kate Middleton Yogi Profile

1987 births
Living people
New Zealand freedivers
Yoga teachers